PFS may refer to:

Medicine
 Patellofemoral syndrome, a type of knee disorder
 Prefilled syringe, a syringe with a predetermined dosage of medication
 Prefrontal synthesis, in neurology, the conscious purposeful process of synthesizing novel mental images
 Progression-free survival, time without tumor progression in oncology

Organisations
Premium Fulfilment Services (PFS Group), National provider of 3PL solutions with operating companies in Australia and New Zealand.
Penang Free School, a well-recognized English school in Malaysia, in the state of Penang
Philadelphia Folksong Society, a Philadelphia organization promoting folk music
Princeton Friends School, a coeducational Quaker school in Princeton Township, New Jersey
 Property and Freedom Society, an organization devoted to the promotion of property rights

Finance
Personal finance society, a professional body for financial advisors in the United Kingdom
Personal Financial Specialist, a financial planning credential granted by the American Institute of Certified Public Accountants
Primerica Financial Services, an independent financial services company in North America

Technology
Perfect forward secrecy, a property in cryptography
pfs:Write, an early PC word processor
Planetary Fourier Spectrometer, an infrared spectrometer used by European Space Agency on their Venus Express Mission
Playstation File System, the filesystem used on the PlayStation 2 hard drive
Professional File System, a third-party filesystem used on the Amiga
PlaysForSure, a marketing certification given by Microsoft to media players
Prepare for Shipment, a status which indicates products are ready for shipment from Apple Online Store
Pre-Feasibility Study, an important preliminary study to determine if a mining project is economically feasible

Other
 Peace and Friendship Stadium, an Indoor sports Arena in Piraeus, Athens, Greece
 Picture Frame Seduction, a Welsh punk rock band
 Port security (Port Facility Security)
 Pha̍k-fa-sṳ, an orthography designed for the Hakka Chinese language
 Puta falta de sacanagem, an expression related to the Brazilian rock band Restart